Jeff Thomas (born July 2, 1958) is a Canadian curler from St. John's, Newfoundland and Labrador. He currently coaches Team Nathan Young.

Career
Thomas is a very well-known coach on the island of Newfoundland and Labrador. He has been coaching since the mid-1980s and he has coached for many of the biggest stars in Newfoundland and Labrador, such as Brad Gushue and Nathan Young.

In 2020, Thomas would get the opportunity to be the alternate for the Gushue rink in the 2020 Tim Hortons Brier. Here they would be successful in claiming the gold medal and qualify themselves for the 2020 World Men's Curling Championship. That tournament would ultimately be cancelled though due to COVID-19. 

In 2021, Thomas was the alternate for the Gushue rink when they competed in the 2021 Canadian Olympic Curling Trials. Here they won and qualified themselves for the 2022 Winter Olympics. This would be the first time that Thomas would have the opportunity to be apart of the Olympics. At the Olympics, Thomas was replaced by Marc Kennedy as the team's alternate, but took on a coaching role.

Personal life
Thomas is retired. He is married and has two sons. One of them, Colin who also competes in curling.

References

Living people
Canadian male curlers
Curlers from Newfoundland and Labrador
Sportspeople from St. John's, Newfoundland and Labrador
Canadian curling coaches
1958 births